This is a list of firearm cartridges which have bullets that are  caliber or larger.

Length refers to the cartridge case length.
OAL refers to the overall length of the cartridge.
Bullet refers to the diameter of the bullet.

All measurements are in mm (in).

13 mm (.5118 in) and over

References

Pistol and rifle cartridges